Schiers railway station is a railway station in the municipality of Schiers, in the Swiss canton of Grisons. It is an intermediate stop on the Rhaetian Railway  Landquart–Davos Platz line.

Services
Schiers is served by regional trains and the S1 of the Chur S-Bahn:

 RegioExpress:
 Hourly service between Disentis/Mustér and Scuol-Tarasp.
 Hourly service between Landquart and St. Moritz.
 Hourly service between Landquart and Davos Platz.
 Regio:
 Limited service to Scuol-Tarasp.
 Limited service between Landquart and Davos Platz.
 Chur S-Bahn : hourly service to Rhäzüns.

References

External links
 
 

Schiers
Railway stations in Graubünden
Rhaetian Railway stations
Railway stations in Switzerland opened in 1889